Snehatheeram Beach or Love Shore is beach in Thalikulam of Thrissur District in Kerala State of India. It lies on the coast of Arabian Sea and attracts domestic tourists in every season. The beach was selected as the best beach tourism destination by the Department of Tourism (Kerala) during the year 2010. The beach is maintained by the Department of Tourism (Kerala).

Facilities
There is children's park located near to the beach with all facilities. The entry fee for park is Rs 10 for adult and Rs 5 for children. An aquarium with large collection of marine species, a well maintained garden and tiled walkway attract tourists to this beach. A restaurant named Naalukettu is also available for tourists for enjoying coastal Thrissur sea food.

References

Beaches of Thrissur district